The 2008 Copa de la Reina de Fútbol was the 26th edition of the main Spanish women's football cup. It was played between 1 and 29 June 2008 and Rayo Vallecano won its first title ever.

Bracket

References

External links
Results at Arquero-Arba

Copa de la Reina
Women
2008